Estradiol hexahydrobenzoate/hydroxyprogesterone caproate/testosterone hexahydrobenzoate (EHHB/OHPC/THHB), sold under the brand name Trinestril AP, is an injectable combination medication of estradiol hexahydrobenzoate (EHHB), an estrogen, hydroxyprogesterone caproate (OHPC), a progestogen, and testosterone hexahydrobenzoate (THHB), an androgen/anabolic steroid. It contained 3 mg EHHB, 75 mg OHPC, and 100 mg THHB and was administered by intramuscular injection once per month. The medication was marketed by 1957.

See also
 List of combined sex-hormonal preparations § Estrogens, progestogens, and androgens

References

Abandoned drugs
Combined estrogen–progestogen–androgen formulations